Earthwood is a brand of Ernie Ball acoustic bass guitars as well as acoustic six string guitars. Ball collaborated with George Fullerton, a former employee at Fender, to develop the Earthwood acoustic bass guitar, which was introduced in 1972. It is notable for being the first modern acoustic bass guitar.

The guitar model featured a bolt-on hard rock maple neck, similar to that on Fender electric and acoustic guitars of the period. The design proved problematic, with too much stress for top. Warranty repairs became very expensive for the company. Later guitars were reinforced but production ceased after only a couple of years.

See also
Acoustic bass guitar

External links
 History at www.ernieball.com.

Guitar manufacturing companies of the United States
Bass guitars